Megan McKay (born 8 January 1997) is a professional basketball player from Australia.

College
In 2015, McKay began her college career after committing to the Saint Mary's Gaels in Moraga, California, participating in NCAA Division I. Her time at Saint Mary's is highlighted by being a two-time All-West Coast Conference First Team Member (2018, 2019).

Saint Mary's statistics
Source

Career

Europe
In 2019, McKay would start her professional career in Germany after signing with TSV 1880 Wasserburg in the Damen-Basketball-Bundesliga for the 2019–20 season. In her 21 games in the season, McKay averaged 16.2 points and 8.0 rebounds per game.

WNBL
In 2020, McKay signed with the Townsville Fire for the 2020–21 season.

National Team

Youth level
McKay made her international debut at the 2013 FIBA Oceania Under-16 Championship in Melbourne, where Australia took home the gold.

References

1997 births
Living people
Australian women's basketball players
Australian expatriate basketball people in the United States
Australian expatriate basketball people in Germany
College women's basketball players in the United States
Centers (basketball)
Saint Mary's Gaels women's basketball players
Medalists at the 2017 Summer Universiade
Universiade gold medalists for Australia
Universiade medalists in basketball